The 15th Annual Australian Recording Industry Association Music Awards (generally known as ARIA Music Awards) were held on 30 October 2001 at the Capitol Theatre. Rock band Powderfinger won the most awards with six from eight nominations. Leading the nominations were dance, electronic group, The Avalanches, with nine nominations: they won four.

Awards
The following list includes the winners, highlighted in bold, and the other final nominations below them.

ARIA Awards
Album of the Year
Powderfinger – Odyssey Number Five
The Avalanches – Since I Left You
Kylie Minogue – Light Years
Something for Kate – Echolalia
You Am I – Dress Me Slowly
Single of the Year
Powderfinger – "My Happiness"
The Avalanches – "Frontier Psychiatrist"
Kylie Minogue – "On a Night Like This"
Something for Kate – "Monsters"
You Am I – "Damage"
Highest Selling Album
Powderfinger – Odyssey Number Five
John Farnham – 
Kylie Minogue – Light Years
Savage Garden – Affirmation
Slim Dusty – Looking Forward Looking Back
Highest Selling Single
Scandal'us – "Me, Myself & I"
Human Nature – "He Don't Love You"
Nikki Webster – "Strawberry Kisses"
Powderfinger – "My Happiness"
Kylie Minogue – "On A Night Like This"
Best Group
Powderfinger – Odyssey Number Five
The Avalanches – Since I Left You
Killing Heidi – "Superman Supergirl"
Something for Kate – Echolalia
You Am I – Dress Me Slowly
Best Female Artist
Kylie Minogue – Light Years
Christine Anu – Come My Way
Jodi Phillis – In Dreams I Live
Leah Haywood – "Takin' Back What's Mine"
Vanessa Amorosi – The Power
Best Male Artist
Nick Cave – No More Shall We Part
John Butler – Three
Paul Kelly – Roll on Summer
Paul Mac – "Just the Thing"
Tex Perkins – Dark Horses
Breakthrough Artist – Album
The Avalanches – Since I Left You
Augie March – Sunset Studies
John Butler Trio – Three
Lo-Tel – Planet of the Stereos
28 Days – Upstyledown
Breakthrough Artist – Single
The Avalanches – "Frontier Psychiatrist"
Eskimo Joe – "Who Sold Her Out"
George – "Special Ones"
The John Butler Trio – John Butler Trio EP
Lash – "Take Me Away"
Best Pop Release
Kylie Minogue – Light Years
Christine Anu – Come My Way
Invertigo – "Chances Are"
Madison Avenue – The Polyester Embassy
Vanessa Amorosi – The Power
Best Dance Release
The Avalanches – Since I Left You
Infusion – Phrases and Numbers
[Love] Tattoo – "The Bass Has Got Me Movin'"
Paul Mac – "Just the Thing"
Sgt Slick – "Let It Ride"
Best Rock Album
Powderfinger – Odyssey Number Five
The Living End – Roll On
The Mark of Cain – This Is This...
Motor Ace – Five Star Laundry
The Superjesus – Jet Age
Best Country Album
Slim Dusty – Looking Forward Looking Back
Audrey Auld – The Fallen
Beccy Cole – Wild at Heart
Gina Jeffreys – Angel
Sara Storer – Chasing Buffalo
Best Independent Release
John Butler Trio – Three
Allan Browne's New Rascals – East St Kilda Toodleoo
Nitocris – "Manic"
Pre-Shrunk – Digital Sunrise
Stella One Eleven – In Your Hands
Best Alternative Release
Art of Fighting – Wires
Big Heavy Stuff – Size of the Ocean
Magic Dirt – What Are Rock Stars Doing Today
Something for Kate – Echolalia
You Am I – Dress Me Slowly
Best Adult Contemporary Album
Mark Seymour – One Eyed Man
Jodi Phillis – In Dreams I Live
John Farnham – 
Stella One Eleven – In Your Hands
Wendy Matthews – Beautiful View
Best Blues & Roots Album
Collard Greens & Gravy – More Gravy
Andy Cowan – 10.30pm Thursdays
Jeff Lang – Everything Is Still
John Butler Trio – Three
The Revelators – The Adventures of The Amazing Revelators
Best Children's Album
Hi-5 – It's a Party
George Spartels, Queensland Philharmonic Orchestra, Sean O'Boyle – George Meets the Orchestra
The Hooley Dooleys – Keep On Dancing
Monica Trapaga – I Love the Zoo 
The Wiggles – Hoop Dee Doo: It's a Wiggly Party
Best Comedy Release
Guido Hatzis – Whatever...
The 12th Man – "Bruce 2000"
Chris Franklin – "Mullet Head"
The Drugs – The Only Way Is Up
Rodney Rude – Ya Mum's Bum

Fine Arts Awards
Best Jazz Album
Bernie McGann Trio – Bundeena
Allan Browne's New Rascals – East St Kilda Toodleoo
Andrew Robson Trio – Sunman
Joe Chindamo Trio – The Joy of Standards
Michelle Nicolle – After the Rain
Paul Grabowsky Trio – Three
Best Classical Album
Genevieve Lacey, Australian Brandenburg Orchestra, Paul Dyer – Vivaldi – Ii Flauto Dolce
Macquarie Trio – Schubert: Complete Piano Trios
Shu-Cheen Yu – Lotus Moon
Stephanie McCallum – Perfume
Woof! – Tuneful Percussion
Best Original Cast / Show Production Recording
Cast Recording – Shout! The Legend Of The Wild One
Australian Concert Orchestra, Queensland Pops Orchestra, Harper – Scotland the Brave
David Chesworth – Wicked Voice
Janet Seidel – Doris and Me
Various – Sydney 2000 The Games of the XXVII Olympiad – Official Music from the Opening Ceremony
Best Original Soundtrack Production Recording
Melbourne Symphony Orchestra, Various – Music from the Motion Picture – The Dish
David Hirschfelder, Various – Better Than Sex – Original Soundtrack
Lisa Gerrard with Hans Zimmer – More Music from Gladiator
Richard Pleasance, Various – The Very Best of SeaChange
Single Gun Theory – The Monkey's Mask
Various – Sydney 2000 The Games of the XXVII Olympiad – Official Music from the Opening Ceremony
Best World Music Album
Mara! – Live in Europe
Akin – Undercurrent
Epizo Bangoura and African Express – Inchallah
George Telek – Serious Tam
Xenos – Tutti Frutti

Artisan Awards
Producer of the Year
Bobbydazzler ( Darren Seltmann, Robbie Chater) – The Avalanches – Since I Left You
Augie March, Paul McKercher, Richard Pleasance – Augie March – Sunset Studies
Kalju Tonuma – Superheist – The Prize Recruit
The Mark of Cain – The Mark of Cain – This Is This...
Nick Launay – The Living End – Roll On
Paul Kosky – Killing Heidi – "Superman Supergirl"
Engineer of the Year
Paul McKercher, Chris Thompson, Richard Pleasance, Chris Dickie – Augie March – Sunset Studies
Doug Brady – John Farnham – 
Kalju Tonuma – Superheist – The Prize Recruit
Nick Launay – The Living End – Roll On
Tony Espie, Bobbydazzler ( Darren Seltmann, Robbie Chater)  – The Avalanches – Since I Left You
Best Video
Ben Saunders – Eskimo Joe – "Wake Up"
Bart Borghesi – Something for Kate – "Monsters"
Mark Hartley – Human Nature – "He Don't Love You"
Mark Hartley – Invertigo – "Chances Are"
Paul Butler, Scott Walton – Gerling – "The Deer in You"
Paul Butler, Scott Walton – Powderfinger – "Like A Dog"
Scandal'us – "Me, Myself & I"
Best Cover Art
Kevin Wilkins – Powderfinger – Odyssey Number Five
Bobbydazzler ( Darren Seltmann, Robbie Chater) – The Avalanches – Since I Left You
Darren Glindemann – The Superjesus – Jet Age
Sam Hickey – Augie March – Sunset Studies
Stephanie Ashworth – Something for Kate – Echolalia

Outstanding Achievement Award
Keith Urban

ARIA Hall of Fame Inductees
The following were inducted into the Hall of Fame.
INXS
The Saints

References

External links
ARIA Awards official website
List of 2001 winners

See also
Australian music

ARIA Music Awards
2001 in Australian music
2001 music awards